This is a list of the number-one hits of 2018 on Italy's Singles and Albums Charts, ranked by the Federazione Industria Musicale Italiana (FIMI).

Chart history

See also
 2018 in music
 List of number-one hits in Italy

References

Number-one hits
Italy
2018